The Ulaanbaatar Book Fair is a book fair organized every year in May and September in Ulaanbaatar, Mongolia. More than 300 authors and more than 120 publishing houses and related organizations attend the event along with thousands of book readers. This event has been organized by the Nomiin Soyolt Ertonts, a non-government organization, since 2007. The fair introduces the newest books and provides opportunities to meet authors and attend their book talks and for networking.

References

External links
 

Book fairs
Events in Mongolia
Ulaanbaatar